Ed Ward may refer to:

Ed Ward (ice hockey) (born 1969), Canadian retired National Hockey League player
Ed Ward (writer) (1948–2021), American writer and radio commentator

See also
Edward Ward (disambiguation)
Edmund Ward (disambiguation)
Edwin Ward (1919–2005), English priest